Barry Richard (born March 28, 1942) is an American attorney and politician who served as a member of the Florida House of Representatives from 1974 to 1978.

Early life and education
Richard is a native of Miami Beach. He received his bachelor's degree from the University of Miami and a Juris Doctor from the University of Miami School of Law.

Career 
Richard served in the United States Navy Judge Advocate General's Corps. From 1974 to 1978, he served as a member of the Florida House of Representatives. He ran for the attorney general of Florida in 1978, but lost the Democratic primary to James C. Smith. In 1998, Richard served as the campaign legal counsel to Jeb Bush and Bill Nelson. He also represented George W. Bush in Bush v. Gore. In 2018, he represented Andrew Gillum during the gubernatorial vote recount.

Richard is a shareholder at Greenberg Traurig.

Personal life 
He is married to Allison Tant and they have three children. Richard also has two children from a previous marriage.

References

External links
 
 Oyez Profile
 Profile at Greenberg Traurig

1942 births
Florida lawyers
Living people
Democratic Party members of the Florida House of Representatives
People from Miami Beach, Florida
University of Miami alumni
University of Miami School of Law alumni